Currents, Current or The Current may refer to:

Science and technology
 Current (fluid), the flow of a liquid or a gas
 Air current, a flow of air
 Ocean current, a current in the ocean
 Rip current, a kind of water current
 Current (stream), currents in rivers and streams
 Convection current, flow caused by unstable density variation due to temperature differences
 Current (mathematics), geometrical current in differential topology
 Conserved current, a field associated to a symmetry in field theory
 Electric current, a flow of electric charge through a medium
 Probability current, in quantum mechanics
 IBM Current, an early personal information management program
 Google Currents (2011–2013), an app developed by Google that provided electronic access to full-length magazine articles from 2011 to 2013
 Google Currents (2019–present), an app developed by Google for internal enterprise communication, still in development with beta version released in 2019

Arts and entertainment

Music
 Current (album), a 1982 album by Heatwave
 Currents (Eisley album)
 Currents (Tame Impala album) 
 "The Current" (song), by the Blue Man Group
 "Currents", a song by Dashboard Confessional from Dusk and Summer, 2006
 "Currents", a song by Drake from Honestly, Nevermind, 2022

Film, television and radio
 Current (1992 film), a Bollywood film
 Current (2009 film), a Telugu film
 Current TV, a defunct television channel in the US
 Currents (TV series), an American Catholic news magazine television show
 Current (platform), an American streaming service
 The Current (radio program), CBC Radio, Canada
 KCMP or 89.3 The Current, a Minnesota Public Radio station, US
 KDAM or Current 94.3, a radio station serving Yankton and Vermillion, South Dakota

Publications
 Current (newspaper), an American trade journal
 Currents (periodical), an international trade law journal
 Current Publishing, an American publishing company
 Current Publishing (UK), a British publishing company
 The Current (news organization), a non-profit online news organization in Lafayette, Louisiana
 The Current (magazine), a student journal of Columbia University, US
 The Current (newspaper), the student newspaper of the University of Missouri-St. Louis, US
 The Current (NSU), the student newspaper of the Nova Southeastern University, US
 The Current Newspapers, four print and online weekly community newspapers in Washington, DC, US

Other uses
 Current Lighting Solutions, a electric subsidiary of American Industrial Partners formerly owned by General Electric
 Finco Services Inc, a US financial services company operating under the name Current
 Kansas City Current, American soccer team in the National Women's Soccer League
 The Current, branding for bus routes operated by Southeast Vermont Transit
 USS Current (ARS-22), a ship

See also
 Current affairs (disambiguation)
 Current events
 Conserved current, a concept in physics and mathematics that satisfies the continuity equation
 Current density, a mathematical concept unifying electric current, fluid current, and others
 Current River (Ozarks), Missouri, US
 Currant (disambiguation)
 Kurrent, German handwriting style